Ada was a wooden ketch that was wrecked on the Oyster Bank at Newcastle, New South Wales, Australia.

Wreck
On 29 April 1897, Ada , and ran aground. She was later dismantled.

References

Sources

Australian Shipwrecks - vol1 1622-1850, Charles Bateson, AH and AW Reed, Sydney, 1972, Call number 910.4530994 BAT 
Australian shipwrecks Vol. 2 1851–1871 By Loney, J. K. (Jack Kenneth), 1925–1995. Sydney. Reed, 1980 910.4530994 LON
Australian shipwrecks Vol. 3 1871–1900 By Loney, J. K. (Jack Kenneth), 1925–1995. Geelong Vic: List Publishing, 1982 910.4530994 LON
Australian shipwrecks Vol. 4 1901–1986 By Loney, J. K. (Jack Kenneth),  1925–1995. Portarlington Vic. Marine History Publications, 1987 910.4530994 LON
Australian shipwrecks Vol. 5 Update 1986 By Loney, J. K. (Jack Kenneth),  1925–1995. Portarlington Vic. Marine History Publications, 1991 910.4530994 LON

Shipwrecks of the Hunter Region
Maritime incidents in 1897
1871–1900 ships of Australia
Merchant ships of Australia
Ketches of Australia
History of Newcastle, New South Wales